Maria Peter Yatrakis (born 10 June 1980), known in Greece as Maria Giatrakis, is an American-born Greek football manager and former player, who played as a goalkeeper. She has been a member of the Greece women's national team.

Early life
Yatrakis was born in Brooklyn Heights to Greek immigrant parents.

College career
Yatrakis attended the University of Connecticut in Storrs, Connecticut.

Club career
After college, Yatrakis tried out for the Women's United Soccer Association but was cut. In 2006, she joined Swedish Damallsvenskan club QBIK.

International career
With the Athens Olympics approaching, Yatrakis applied for Greek citizenship in 2002, and joined the Greek national team that same year. She was one of several American-born Greek players on the team. She played for the Greece women's national football team at the 2004 Summer Olympics.

Managerial career
Yatrakis worked as an assistant coach for the Columbia University Lions.

See also
 Greece at the 2004 Summer Olympics

References

External links
 
 

1980 births
Living people
Women's association football goalkeepers
Greek women's footballers
Greece women's international footballers
Olympic footballers of Greece
Footballers at the 2004 Summer Olympics
Damallsvenskan players
QBIK players
Greek expatriate women's footballers
Greek expatriate sportspeople in Sweden
Expatriate women's footballers in Sweden
American women's soccer players
Sportspeople from Brooklyn
Soccer players from New York City
People from Brooklyn Heights
Citizens of Greece through descent
American people of Greek descent
Sportspeople of Greek descent
UConn Huskies women's soccer players
American expatriate women's soccer players
American expatriate sportspeople in Sweden